Bilel Mhamdi (born 27 January 1992) is a Tunisian boxer. He competed in the men's bantamweight event at the 2016 Summer Olympics. Mhamdi won a bronze medal in the bantamweight division at the 2018 Mediterranean Games.

References

External links
 

1992 births
Living people
Tunisian male boxers
Olympic boxers of Tunisia
Competitors at the 2015 African Games
Competitors at the 2019 African Games
African Games medalists in boxing
African Games gold medalists for Tunisia
Boxers at the 2016 Summer Olympics
Mediterranean Games bronze medalists for Tunisia
Competitors at the 2018 Mediterranean Games
Competitors at the 2022 Mediterranean Games
Mediterranean Games medalists in boxing
Place of birth missing (living people)
Bantamweight boxers
21st-century Tunisian people